Armando Farro (20 December 1922 – 30 November 1982) was an Argentine footballer. He played in two matches for the Argentina national football team in 1945. He was also part of Argentina's squad for the 1945 South American Championship.

References

External links
 

1922 births
1982 deaths
Argentine footballers
Argentina international footballers
Place of birth missing
Association football forwards
Ferro Carril Oeste footballers
Club Atlético Banfield footballers
San Lorenzo de Almagro footballers